William Dale Montgomery (born 1945) is a retired United States diplomat. He served as the US ambassador in Bulgaria, Croatia and Serbia and Montenegro.

Early life and education
Montgomery has a Bachelor's degree in Psychology from Bucknell University and a Master's degree in Business Administration in International Business from George Washington University. While working for the Department of State, he attended the National War College for its one-year program in 1986-87.

Career
Montgomery served in the U.S. Army from 1967 to 1970, including one year of service in the War in Vietnam. He started his career as a United States Foreign Service Officer in 1974. He was Executive Assistant to Secretary of State Lawrence Eagleburger and then Deputy Secretary of State Clifton Reginald Wharton Jr. He was Deputy Chief of the Mission in Sofia from June 1988 to May 1991.

His other assignments have included Economic-Commercial Officer in the Embassy in Belgrade, Commercial Officer and Political Officer in the Embassy in Moscow, and Deputy Chief of Mission in Dar es Salaam, as well as assignments in Washington, D.C. He served as US Ambassador to Bulgaria from October 1993 to January 1996. In 1996-1997, he served in US State Department Special Advisor for Bosnian Peace Implementation.

Montgomery was selected as Chief of Mission at the US Embassy in Belgrade, Serbia and Montenegro upon the re-establishment of diplomatic relations on 17 November 2000, and was confirmed as the US Ambassador to Serbia and Montenegro on 15 November 2001. He retired in February 2004.

Awards
At the end of his tour as Deputy Chief of Mission, the Bulgarian government awarded him the Order Of The Madara Horseman, First Class. At the end of his tour as Ambassador to Bulgaria, Montgomery was awarded the Order of the Stara Planina, First Class, by the Government of Bulgaria.

He has one Distinguished Honor Award, two individual and two group Superior Honor Awards, and one Meritorious Honor Award from the US Department of State. He is also a recipient of an ABA-CEELI award for his efforts to promote the rule of law in Central and Eastern Europe.

His army decorations include the Bronze Star, Army Commendation Medal with "V" (for valor), Combat Infantryman Badge, Parachute Badge, and Vietnam Service Medal.

Personal life
Montgomery is married to the former Lynne Germain, and they have three children. He speaks Russian, Bulgarian and Serbo-Croatian.

His wife Lynne German Montgomery is "said to have brought about the downfall of ambassador William Montgomery, 58, the most powerful diplomat in the region, who is leaving his post nine months early."

References

Sources 

 
 Office of the Historian: William Dale Montgomery 

Ambassadors of the United States to Serbia
Ambassadors of the United States to Bulgaria
George Washington University School of Business alumni
Ambassadors of the United States to Croatia
1945 births
Living people
United States Foreign Service personnel
Bucknell University alumni